Katja Kiiskinen (born 10 October 1983) is a Finnish curler and curling coach.

At the national level, she is a two-time Finnish women's champion curler (2003, 2010), three-time Finnish mixed doubles champion curler (2011, 2013, 2015), 2010 Finnish mixed champion curler.

Teams

Women's

Mixed

Mixed doubles

Record as a coach of national teams

Personal life
Her brother Kalle Kiiskinen is also a curler and curling coach, he is a silver medallist of 2006 Winter Olympics.

She started curling in 2000 at the age of 17.

References

External links

 Video: 

Living people
1983 births
Finnish female curlers
Finnish curling champions
Finnish curling coaches
Place of birth missing (living people)